Graduate House at the University of Toronto is a student residence specifically for graduate students, designed by Thom Mayne of Morphosis Architects in Los Angeles together with Toronto's Teeple Architects. It is located at 60 Harbord Street, Toronto, Ontario, Canada.

History
Before 2000, the Graduate Student Residence was a building at 321 Bloor St W, known as the St. George Apartments. The four-storey U-shaped residence, built in 1926, was designed by the firm of Paisley & Marani. On August 18, 1976, the building was added into the City of Toronto's Inventory of Heritage Properties. In 2001, the University began the process to redevelop the site to accommodate the Woodsworth College residence.

The new Graduate House opened in 2000 and accommodates 435 students.

Building
Located on the western edge of the campus, on the north-east corner of Spadina Avenue and Harbord Street, the residence marks the main western entrance to the campus with a long structure extending halfway over Harbord Street featuring a massive "University of Toronto" sign.  The building is considered one of the more important works of architect Thom Mayne, who won the Pritzker Prize in 2005. The building won a number of awards, but its design was not without controversy with a number of students and area residents criticizing its unusual façade and concrete interior.

Graduate House contains two to five bedroom apartment-style suites for full-time Graduate and Second-Entry Professional Faculty single students. The residence also contains various amenities including underground parking, bike storage, a laundry room, a reading room, and a common room.

References

"U of T residence a landmark for 21st century." Toronto Star. Nov 20, 1999. pg. 1
"A transformation in concrete and wit." Christopher Hume. Toronto Star. Sep 19, 2004. pg. B.04

External links
 
 Site for residents
 Official University of Toronto Graduate House article by Morphosis

University of Toronto buildings
University residences in Canada
Postmodern architecture in Canada
2000 establishments in Ontario
Residential buildings completed in 2000
School buildings completed in 2000